Sobral Public Airport, named after Cel. Virgílio Távora Airport''' , is an airport serving Sobral, Brazil.

History
The airport ceased to receive commercial flights on February 26, 2023. Those flights now operate at Luciano de Arruda Coelho Airport. 

The following airline once served the airport: Azul Conecta.

Airlines and destinations
No scheduled flights operate at this airport.

Access

See also

List of airports in Brazil

References

External links

Airports in Ceará